Fox Crossing may refer to:

Places
Fox Crossing, Wisconsin, a village, United States

See also
Fox Creek (disambiguation)
Fox River (disambiguation)